Timp (short for Mount Timpanogos) is the second highest mountain in Utah's Wasatch Range.

Timp or TIMP may refer to:

 timp, a music artist from Pittsburgh, PA
 Timp, a colloquial word for timpani
 Tissue inhibitor of metalloproteinases, a family of proteins that act as enzyme inhibitors
 Thioinosine monophosphate, an intermediate metabolite of azathioprine

See also
 Temp (disambiguation)